Open House New York (OHNY) is a cultural nonprofit organization that holds annual Doors Open Days. It was founded in 2001 in New York City.

Organization 
Open House New York (OHNY) is a 501(c)(3) nonprofit organization that hosts educational programs to promote awareness and appreciation of New York's architecture, design and cultural heritage.  In addition to behind the scenes looks at iconic buildings, the Festival also provides access to organizations that are not regularly open to the public.

History 

The first-ever OHNY Weekend took place on October 11 and 12, 2003. By the 7th festival in 2009, it had grown to 185,000 visitors to more than 190 sites. OHNY offered 130 free of charge tours, workshops and onsite talks. 125 art, civic, educational and cultural organizations and 70 architecture and design firms participated.  The 13th edition and 14th editions, in 2015 and 2016, respectively, included a photo contest in partnership with Wikipedia. Three prizes were awarded.
 
In the spirit of accessibility, in 2022 Open House New York introduced lottery-based access that eliminated the reservation fee to access many participating sites.

See also 
 Archtober
 Open House London
 Open House Chicago
 Doors Open Days
 Doors Open Canada
 Doors Open Toronto

References

External links

Culture of New York City
Architecture organizations based in the United States
New York
Recurring events established in 2002
2001 establishments in New York City
Arts organizations established in 2001
Non-profit organizations based in New York City